The 2004 European Weightlifting Championships were held in Kyiv, Ukraine between 20-25 April 2004. It was the 83rd edition of the event.

Medal overview

Men

Women

Medal table

Men's results

Men's 56 kg

Men's 62 kg

Men's 69 kg

Men's 77 kg

Men's 85 kg

External links
 Database with weightlifting results (in German)

European Weightlifting Championships
International sports competitions hosted by Ukraine
Sports competitions in Kyiv
2004 in Ukrainian sport
2004 in weightlifting
2000s in Kyiv
Weightlifting in Ukraine
April 2004 sports events in Europe